Idea agamarschana, the Andaman tree-nymph or Burma tree nymph, is a large butterfly that belongs to the danaid group of the family Nymphalidae. It is found in Burma, Bangladesh, India and on the Andaman Islands. The habitat consists of forest clearings and it is also found above the forest canopy.

Subspecies
Idea agamarschana agamarschana (southern Burma to Assam)
Idea agamarschana hadeni (Wood-Mason & de Nicéville, 1880) (southern Burma to Bengal)
Idea agamarschana arrakana Fruhstorfer, 1910 (Upper Burma to Bangladesh) – Burma tree nymph
Idea agamarschana cadelli Wood-Mason & de Nicéville, 1880 (Andamans) - Andaman tree-nymph or Andaman tree nymph

References

Butterflies described in 1865
Idea (butterfly)
Butterflies of Asia
Taxa named by Baron Cajetan von Felder
Taxa named by Rudolf Felder